Agate is a semi-precious stone.

Agate may also refer to:

Geography
 Agate, Colorado
 Agate, Nebraska
 Agate, North Dakota
 Agate Beach, Oregon
 Agate Desert, Oregon
 Agate Fossil Beds National Monument, Nebraska 
 Agate Pass, Washington

Other uses
 AGATE (architecture framework)
 Agate (game company)
 Agate (rocket)
 Agate (typography)
 Agate Publishing
 , a ship
 AGATE (Advanced General Aviation Transport Experiments), a NASA program
 Agate (name)